The Sri Lanka national cricket team toured Australia in the 1995-96 season and played 3 Test matches against Australia.  Australia won the series 3-0.

The second Test had controversy when umpire Darrell Hair called Sri Lanka's Muttiah Muralitharan for throwing.

Test series summary

1st Test

2nd Test

3rd Test

External sources
 ESPN cricinfo

References
 Playfair Cricket Annual (annual)
 Wisden Cricketers Almanack (annual)

1995 in Australian cricket
1995 in Sri Lankan cricket
1995–96 Australian cricket season
1996 in Australian cricket
1996 in Sri Lankan cricket
International cricket competitions from 1994–95 to 1997
1995-96